John Cooke (17 February 176221 October 1805) was an experienced and highly regarded officer of the Royal Navy during the American War of Independence, the French Revolutionary Wars and the first years of the Napoleonic Wars. Cooke is best known for his death in handtohand combat with French forces during the Battle of Trafalgar in 1805. During the action, his ship  was badly damaged and boarded by sailors and marines from the French ship of the line . Cooke was killed in the ensuing melee, but his crew successfully drove off their opponents and ultimately forced the surrender of Aigle.

Cooke, unlike many of his fellow officers, was never a notable society figure. He was however well respected in his profession and following his death was the subject of tributes from officers who had served alongside him. Memorials to him were placed in St Paul's Cathedral and his local church in Wiltshire.

Early life

Francis was the third son of the Reverend John Cooke and Elizabeth, eldest daughter of Dr. Thomas Sayer, Archdeacon of Surrey. Margaret was the second daughter of Moses and Mary Baker, of the Parish of St Christopher le Stocks, in the City of London. The Cooke family line had come from Devon, where they had been landowners and shipowners at Kenbury, near Exeter and Topsham. The Reverend John Cooke was a former rector of Chilbolton and Bishop's Waltham, and was appointed a Canon and 5th Prebendary of Winchester Cathedral by Bishop Trelawny.

By 1750, Francis was established at Greenwich as an Admiralty ledger writer in the Cashiers' Branch of the Navy Pay Office, and as the treasurer of the Greenwich Hospital, London. Francis became a director of the Amicable Society for a Perpetual Assurance Office by 1775, and on 17July 1787, The Right Honourable Henry Dundas appointed him Cashier of the Navy. Francis had married Margaret on 29May 1757 at StMary's, Chatham, Kent. John Cooke was baptised on 5March 1762, at the Cooke's home in the Tenterground at Goodman's Fields, in the parish of StMary, Whitechapel. Sir John Bentley and William Henry Ricketts, were godfathers, Mrs Pigott of Bloomsbury Square, was godmother.

Early naval career
John Cooke first went to sea at the age of eleven aboard the cutter  under Lieutenant John Bazely, before going ashore to spend time at Mr Braken's naval academy at Greenwich. He was entered onto the books of one of the royal yachts by Sir Alexander Hood, who would become an enduring patron of Cooke's. In 1776 he obtained a position as a midshipman on the ship of the line , aged thirteen. Cooke served aboard Eagle, the flagship of the North American Station, during the next three years, seeing extensive action along the eastern seaboard. Notable among these actions were the naval operations around the Battle of Rhode Island in 1778, when Eagle was closely engaged with American units ashore. He distinguished himself in the assault, causing Admiral Lord Howe to exclaim "Why, young man, you wish to become a Lieutenant before you are of sufficient age!" On 21January 1779, Cooke was promoted to lieutenant and joined  in the East Indies under Sir Edward Hughes, but was forced to take a leave of absence due to illhealth.

Cooke returned to England and then went to France to spend a year studying, before rejoining the navy in 1782 with an appointment to the 90gun  under Captain Alan Gardner. Cooke saw action at the Battle of the Saintes, at which Duke was heavily engaged. He remained with Gardner following the signing of the Treaty of Paris in 1783, bringing an end to the American War of Independence, and served as his firstlieutenant aboard his next command, the 50gun . Gardner became commodore at Jamaica, flying his broad pennant aboard Europa and retaining Cooke as his firstlieutenant until Cooke was injured in a bad fall and had to be invalided home. He had recovered sufficiently by the time of the Spanish Armament in 1790 to be able to take up an appointment from his old patron, Sir Alexander Hood, to be thirdlieutenant of his flagship, the 90gun . When the crisis passed without breaking into open war, London was paid off and Cooke went ashore.

Frigate command

With the outbreak of the French Revolutionary Wars in February 1793, Cooke rejoined Hood and became firstlieutenant of his new flagship, the 100gun , part of the Channel Fleet. On 21February 1794, Cooke was promoted to commander and given his first independent command, the small fire ship . Three months later, Incendiary was a signal repeater for the Channel Fleet during the Atlantic campaign of May 1794, relaying Lord Howe's signals to the fleet and operating as a scout in the search for the French fleet under Louis Thomas Villaret de Joyeuse. On 1June 1794, Cooke was a witness to the battle of the Glorious First of June, although his tiny ship was far too small to engage in combat. In the action's aftermath, Cooke was included in the general promotions issued to the fleet, becoming a post-captain on 23July 1794. For a year, Cooke was stationed off Newfoundland as flag captain to Sir James Wallace aboard the 74gun , before returning to Britain and being offered command of the 28gun HMS Tourterelle. Cooke accepted, but when he found out she was ordered to the West Indies, he resigned it, having been told by Gardner that further service in the West Indies would likely kill him.

Instead in early 1796 he took command of the 36gun frigate . Nymphe was employed in the blockade of the French Atlantic ports over the next year, and on 9March 1797 was in company with  when they encountered the returning ships of a shortlived French invasion attempt of Britain that had been defeated at Fishguard in Wales. The French ships attempted to escape into Brest, but were hunted down by the British, who forced the surrender of Résistance and Constance in turn after successive short engagements. Neither of the British ships suffered a single casualty in the combat, and both French ships were subsequently purchased into the Royal Navy, bringing prize money to Cooke and his crew.

Despite this success, Cooke was unpopular with his men due to the strict discipline he enforced aboard his ship. This was graphically demonstrated just two months after the action off Brest, when Nymphe became embroiled in the Spithead mutiny. Cooke attempted to assist Admiral John Colpoys at the mutiny's outbreak, and was ordered ashore by his crew when he tried to return to his ship. Cooke was tactfully removed from command by the Admiralty following the mutiny, although he was returned to service two years later aboard the new frigate  in preparation for the AngloRussian invasion of the Batavian Republic. During the invasion, Amethyst conveyed the Duke of York to the Netherlands and later participated in the evacuation of the force following the campaign's collapse.

Cooke was involved in operations in Quiberon Bay during the remainder of 1799, and in 1800 participated in an abortive invasion of Ferrol. During this time, Amethyst captured six French merchant ships and small privateers. Amethyst was not heavily engaged with Dédaigneuse and received no damage, but aided in pursuing and trapping the French ship so that she could be seized. Dédaigneuse was later purchased into the Royal Navy as HMS Dedaigneuse. Shortly afterwards, Cooke captured the Spanish ship Carlotta and the French privateer Général Brune in the same area.

Trafalgar

With the Treaty of Amiens, Cooke briefly retired on halfpay before being recalled to the fleet at the outbreak of the Napoleonic Wars in 1803. Cooke was requested as flag captain by Admiral Sir William Young at Plymouth, but Cooke tactfully refused, instead applying for active service. In May, after the large combined French and Spanish fleet, under Admiral Pierre-Charles Villeneuve escaped from Toulon, beginning the Trafalgar campaign, Cooke was ordered to join a flying squadron under ViceAdmiral Cuthbert Collingwood. The squadron arrived off Cádiz on 9 June and Collingwood detached Bellerophon and three other ships to blockade Cartagena under RearAdmiral Sir Richard Bickerton. When the combined fleet entered Cádiz on 20 August, Collingwood recalled Bickerton's force and mounted a blockade of the port. Collingwood was reinforced with more ships, and was later superseded by Nelson. Cooke was heard to say at this time that "To be in a general engagement with Nelson would crown all my military ambition." Nelson had Villeneuve's fleet trapped in Cádiz and was blockading the harbour awaiting their expected attempt to escape.

The FrancoSpanish fleet escaped Cádiz on 18October 1805, but was soon chased down by Nelson and brought to battle on 21 October. Cooke was stationed fifth in Collingwood's line, and so was one of the first ships engaged in action with the combined fleet. Cooke took the unusual step of informing his first lieutenant William Pryce Cumby and his master Edward Overton of Nelson's orders, in case he should be killed.

Bellerophon was soon closely engaged with the French, breaking through the enemy line and closing with Aigle. As with the other French ships in the fleet, Aigle's rigging and mastheads were occupied by musketeers and grenadiers, who kept up a steady fire on Bellerophon and took a heavy toll of sailors exposed on the British ship's deck. Much of the fire was directed at the quarterdeck, where Cooke, Cumby and Overton stood. Cumby noted with surprise that Cooke was still wearing his uniform coat, which sported epaulettes that marked him out as the ship's captain to French snipers. Cooke had forgotten to remove the epaulettes and recognised the danger they represented, but replied "It is too late to take them off. I see my situation, but I will die like a man."

As the action continued, the Captain PierrePaul Gourège of Aigle ordered his crew to board and seize Bellerophon, hoping to use their superiority of numbers to overwhelm the British crew. Cooke sent Cumby below to make sure that the lowerdeck guns continued to fire into the French ship as the battle continued overhead, and threw himself at the French sailors pouring onto Bellerophon's quarterdeck, shooting an enemy officer dead and engaging in handtohand combat with the men behind him. Within minutes Cumby had returned to the deck with reinforcements from below, passing the mortally wounded Overton on the ladder. The badly wounded ship's quartermaster was also present, and he informed Cumby that Cooke had fallen in the melee. Cumby's charge cleared the French from the deck of Bellerophon, and he found Cooke dead on the quarterdeck, two musket balls lodged in his chest. Cooke's last words had been "Let me lie quietly a minute. Tell Lieutenant Cumby never to strike."

Cumby took charge of the battered Bellerophon, directing her fire into Aigle and ultimately forcing the French ship's surrender after the arrival of other British vessels. Bellerophon had suffered grievously, losing 27 dead and 127 wounded. Although Aigle was lost in the chaotic storm which followed the battle, Bellerophon survived, primarily due to Cumby's leadership. He was later promoted to post captain for his services in the action. Cooke's body was buried at sea the day after the battle with the other fatal casualties from Bellerophon.

Family and legacy

Cooke's death, as with those of George Duff and Admiral Nelson himself, was widely mourned in Britain. Cooke's widow Louisa and their eightyearold daughter, Louisa Charlotte, were given numerous awards and presents, including the gold medal minted for the captains who had fought at the action, and a large silver vase presented by Lloyd's Patriotic Fund. On 12 April 1806, Louisa and Louisa Charlotte were awarded a widow and child pension by the British Government, of £200 and £50 respectively.

At least some of the money the family received was spent on a large wall plaque mounted in StAndrew's Church in Donhead St Andrew, Wiltshire, close to the family home at Donhead Lodge in StBartholomew's Street. The plaque commemorates Cooke's life and death and also that of his wife. A memorial was also raised to him in St Paul's Cathedral. Tributes from fellow officers were also forthcoming, including from the future explorer John Franklin, who had served on Bellerophon at Trafalgar and had said of Cooke that he was "very gentlemanly and active. I like his appearance very much." A number of letters that Cooke wrote to his brother prior to Trafalgar are held by the National Maritime Museum.

Cooke had married Louisa, néeHardy, on 15June 1790 at St Leonard's, Shoreditch. Louisa was the fourth daughter of Josiah Hardy, the former Governor of New Jersey, and later consul at Cádiz. Cooke had leased Donhead Lodge from Baron Henry Arundell in 1803 and Louisa remained in residence there until 1813. The funeral was held at St Peter's, Leckhampton, on 11February 1853, with interment following in the churchyard. Louisa Charlotte married Abraham John Newenham Devonsher of Kilshanick, County Cork, at Cheltenham, on 9March 1820. She was interred at Bouncer's Lane Cemetery, Prestbury, Cheltenham, on 5May 1871.

Arms
The original arms were granted and confirmed by the Heralds' College to John Cooke, of Exeter, in 1687.

See also

Footnotes

References

Bibliography

Further reading

External links
 Collections related to Cooke held at the National Maritime Museum.
 Details on Cooke's Memorial in StPaul's Cathedral held at the Imperial War Museums.
 The Battle of Trafalgar by Andrew Lambert for BBC Online.
 The Royal Navy 1776 to 1815. A Biographical History and Chronicle at morethannelson.com.

1762 births
1805 deaths
British military personnel killed in action in the Napoleonic Wars
Burials at sea
People who died at sea
Royal Navy captains at the Battle of Trafalgar
Royal Navy officers
Royal Navy personnel of the American Revolutionary War
Royal Navy personnel of the French Revolutionary Wars
Royal Navy personnel of the Napoleonic Wars